Liquin is a quick-drying medium for oil and alkyd paint. Used as an additive in many forms of artwork, Liquin is produced by Winsor & Newton and has a number of uses.

Origin
Alkyd resin medium for artists was first invented in the 1970s by Arthur DeCosta, a longtime professor at The Pennsylvania Academy of the Fine Arts in Philadelphia.  DeCosta's medium, Turco Classic, was sold only locally at the Academy's school store, the Philadelphia Utrecht Linen art supply store, and one or two other privately owned art supply stores.  DeCosta believed his medium had similar qualities to Maroger medium (Jacques Maroger), the fast drying, supposed medium of the Old Masters.  Because Maroger medium must be cooked with lead, Turco lacked its inherent danger and had a similar, if not faster, drying time.

"The Kid," as DeCosta called the young man responsible for the manufacture of Turco, often made poor batches of the product and DeCosta, being a full-time professor as well as a prominent Philadelphia painter (notable for his portrait of former mayor Frank Rizzo), gave up on the enterprise sometime in the early 1980s.  Since then many companies have produced similar products, Liquin being the most popular.

Method
Winsor & Newton suggests the use of Liquin as a ''fat'' or ''flexible'' agent, to increase the flexibility subsequent layers. While Liquin Original, and Liquin Light Gel Medium are mixtures of petroleum distillates, Liquin Oleopasto, and Liquin Impasto are mixtures of alkyd resin and petroleum distillates.

Innovation
Notably, it is used to speed the drying time in oil painting, though it may also be used as a barrier layer to achieve some effects. Painted over the top of etchings, India-ink drawings and other line art, it enables the application of colours by tinting with thin glazes of oil paint. This technique was first discovered by the artist Patrick Woodroffe and is outlined in his book A Closer Look (Paper Tiger, 1986).

Liquin also permits the creation of "save" layers in painting.

Painted over all, or part, of an artwork in progress (and left to dry), Liquin allows the artist to scrape or wipe back subsequent work to the Liquin layer, while preserving all work beneath.

It can also be used as a simple carrier base and, when compressed together with paint under a layer of plastic wrap, produces effective decalcomania.

References

Painting materials